Fanlo is a municipality located in the province of Huesca, Aragon, Spain. According to the 2004 census (INE), the municipality had a population of 172 inhabitants.

List of villages included in the municipality
 Buerba
 Buisán
 Ceresuela
 Nerín
 Yeba

References

Municipalities in the Province of Huesca